Karl Dietrich Leonhard Engel (born Oldenburg, 21 February 1824; died Adlershof, February 1913) was a German musician and writer.

Biography
He went to Russia as a violin virtuoso at the age of 18, becoming a member of the Imperial Orchestra at Saint Petersburg at 22, and later its concertmaster. He went to Dresden in 1869 and took up his residence there.

Literary works
Among his works are:
 Deutsche Puppen Komödien (1874–93)
 Das Volksschauspiel Doktor Johann Faust (2d ed., 1882)
 Zusammenstellung der Faustschriften vom 16 Jahrhundert bis Mitte 1884 (2d ed., 1884)
 Die Don Juan Sage auf der Bühne (1887)

Musical works
His musical compositions include a concerto in B minor and the humorous fantasy entitled “Jüdischer Carneval.”

Notes

References

External links
 

1824 births
1913 deaths
German composers
German non-fiction writers
German male non-fiction writers
19th-century German musicians